Dehgah (also Romanized as Dehgāh, Deh Gāh, and Deygāh) is a village in Darreh Seydi Rural District, in the Central District of Borujerd County, Lorestan Province, Iran. At the 2006 census, its population was 848, in 239 families.

References 

Towns and villages in Borujerd County